Kathleen C. Passidomo (born May 19, 1953) is an American lawyer and politician serving in the Florida Senate. A Republican, she has represented the 28th district, which includes Collier, Hendry, and part of Lee County in Southwest Florida, since 2016. She previously served three terms in the Florida House of Representatives, representing the Naples area from 2010 to 2016. She served as majority leader from 2018 to 2020.

Early life and legal career
Passidomo was born in Jersey City, New Jersey, and attended Trinity Washington University in Washington, D.C., graduating with a Bachelor's degree in 1975, and later graduated from the Stetson University College of Law with a J.D. degree in 1978 after moving to the state of Florida in 1976. She has resided in Naples since 1979. She entered into private law practice and is a founding partner of the law firm of Kelly, Passidomo & Alba LLP.

Florida House of Representatives
In 2010, when incumbent Republican State Representative Tom Grady declined to seek another term in the legislature, Passidomo ran to succeed him in the 76th District, which stretched from Naples Park to Chokoloskee on the western coast of Collier County. She won both the Republican primary and the general election entirely unopposed.

Following the reconfiguration of legislative districts in 2012, Passidomo was moved into the 106th District, which included most of the territory that she had previously represented in Collier County. In the Republican primary, she was opposed by David Bolduc, whom she easily defeated with 73% of the vote. Advancing to the general election, Passidomo faced Libertarian candidate Peter Richter, whom she defeated in a landslide, winning her second term in the legislature with 79% of the vote.

While in the legislature, Passidomo spoke out in favor of legislation authored by Florida House of Representatives Hazelle P. Rogers in 2011 that required school districts to "adopt a dress code that prohibits students from 'wearing clothing that exposes underwear or body parts in an indecent or vulgar manner. "She was dressed like a 21-year-old prostitute... [Students should] show up in proper attire" Passidomo about the 11-year-old gang raped by 18 men in Texas. In 2013, she authored legislation that would expedite the foreclosure process in the state of Florida, which would "[shorten] the period of time banks can collect losses from five years to one."

Florida Senate 
In 2016, Passidomo ran for the Florida Senate, District 28 seat vacated by Garrett Richter, who was term limited. She defeated state representative Matt Hudson in the Republican primary, 58% to 42%, and faced only write-in candidates in the general election.

Passidomo was re-elected to a second term on November 6, 2018, after facing no primary challenger and winning 65% of the vote in the general election.

Passidomo is one of the founders of Maggie's List.

In 2020 she was an elector for Donald Trump.

References

External links
Florida Senate - Kathleen Passidomo
Florida House of Representatives - Kathleen Passidomo
Passidomo for State House

|-

|-

|-

|-

1953 births
21st-century American politicians
21st-century American women politicians
2020 United States presidential electors
Conservatism in the United States
Living people
Republican Party members of the Florida House of Representatives
Stetson University College of Law alumni
Women state legislators in Florida